10.000 dollari per un massacro (internationally released as $10.000 Blood Money and Guns of Violence) is a 1967 Italian Spaghetti Western film directed by Romolo Guerrieri.

The film was one of the unofficial sequels of Django, and had the working title 7 dollari su Django ("7 Dollars on Django").

It was shown as part of a retrospective on Spaghetti Western at the 64th Venice International Film Festival.

Plot
Local crime boss Manuel kidnaps Dolores, the daughter of rich rancher Mendoza. Her father hires Django to free her. Spoiler: The movie ended with Django riding away into the sunset with Dolores mourning over her dead kidnapper and lover Manuel.

Cast

References

External links

Ten Thousand Dollars for a Massacre at Variety Distribution

1966 films
Spaghetti Western films
1967 Western (genre) films
1967 films
Django films
Films directed by Romolo Guerrieri
Films shot in Almería
Films scored by Nora Orlandi
1960s Italian-language films
1960s Italian films